Feetham is a hamlet opposite Low Row in the Yorkshire Dales, North Yorkshire, England.

The origin of the place-name is from Old Norse and means place at the riverside meadows; it appears as Fytun in 1242.

References

External links

Villages in North Yorkshire
Swaledale